Samuel Ayew Yeboah (born 10 April 1988) is a Ghanaian professional soccer player.

Career

Inter Allies and Liberty Professionals
After a successful season with Inter Allies in 2006/2007, Yeboah was loaned to Liberty Professionals in September 2005, with a purchase option.

Liberty Professionals
In December 2007, Liberty Professionals bought his contract.

Sekondi Wise Fighters
In the summer of 2009, Ayew Yeboah was sold by Liberty Professionals to Sekondi Wise Fighters, where he played for the 2009–2010 season. Sekondi Wise Fighters finished in sixteenth place at the end of the 2009–2010 Glo Premier League season. In September 2010, Ayew Yeboah left Sekondi Wise Fighters to sign with his former club Liberty Professionals.

Return to Liberty Professionals
Due to Ayew Yeboah's performance, Liberty Professionals signed him in September 2010.

Move to Europe 
In 2011 he left Ghana and went on trial to Danish club Thisted FC. On 29 November 2011 he signed with Tvøroyrar Bóltfelag from Faroe Islands.

Return to Ghana 
After one year with the newly promoted Faroe Faroe Islands Tvøroyrar Bóltfelag club, Yeboah returned to Ghana and signed for Tema Youth. Yeboah had stints in the United States of America in 2013 with a club called  fc. Samuel returned to Ghana in 2014 to play for Inter Allies until 2016.

International career
Ayew Yeboah was called up for the Ghana national football team (Black Stars) on 20 August 2008 for a friendly game against Tanzania national football team. Ayew Yeboah was also member of the Ghana squad that played in the 2009 African Nations Championship that was held in Côte d'Ivoire.

References

External links
 

1988 births
Living people
Ghanaian footballers
Association football midfielders
Liberty Professionals F.C. players
Sekondi Wise Fighters players
International Allies F.C. players
Ghana international footballers
People from Tamale, Ghana
Ghana A' international footballers
2009 African Nations Championship players